The Geokichla thrushes are medium-sized mostly insectivorous or omnivorous birds in the thrush family, Turdidae. They were traditionally listed in the Zoothera, but studies suggested their placement in another genus.     The genus name Geokichla comes from Ancient Greek geo-, "ground-" and kikhle, " thrush".

List of species
 Siberian thrush, Geokichla sibirica
Pied thrush, Geokichla wardii
Grey ground thrush, Geokichla princei
Black-eared ground thrush, Geokichla cameronensis
 Spotted ground thrush, Geokichla guttata - formerly G. fischeri
Spot-winged thrush, Geokichla spiloptera
Crossley's ground thrush, Geokichla crossleyi
Abyssinian ground thrush, Geokichla piaggiae
 Kivu ground thrush, Geokichla piaggiae tanganjicae
Oberländer's ground thrush, Geokichla oberlaenderi
Orange ground thrush, Geokichla gurneyi
Orange-headed thrush, Geokichla citrina
Buru thrush, Geokichla dumasi
 Seram thrush, Geokichla joiceyi
Orange-sided thrush, Geokichla peronii
Slaty-backed thrush, Geokichla schistacea
 Chestnut-capped thrush, Geokichla interpres
 Enggano thrush, Geokichla leucolaema
Chestnut-backed thrush, Geokichla dohertyi
 Ashy thrush, Geokichla cinerea
Red-backed thrush, Geokichla erythronota
 Red-and-black thrush, Geokichla mendeni
 Mauritius ground thrush, Geokichla longitarsus

References

External links

Asian thrush videos on the Internet Bird Collection

 
Bird genera
Taxa named by Salomon Müller